Cynthia Ozick (born April 17, 1928) is an American short story writer, novelist, and essayist.

Biography
Cynthia Ozick was born in New York City, the second of two children. She moved to the Bronx with her Belarusian-Jewish parents from Hlusk, Belarus: Celia ( Regelson) and William Ozick, proprietors of the Park View Pharmacy in the Pelham Bay neighborhood.

She attended Hunter College High School in Manhattan. She earned her B.A. from New York University and went on to study at Ohio State University, where she completed an M.A. in English literature, focusing on the novels of Henry James.

She appears briefly in the film Town Bloody Hall, where she asks Norman Mailer with her signature wit and incisiveness, "in Advertisements for Myself you said, quote, 'A good novelist can do without everything but the remnant of his balls'. For years and years I’ve been wondering, Mr. Mailer, when you dip your balls in ink, what color ink is it?". 

Ozick was married to Bernard Hallote, a lawyer, until his death in 2017. Their daughter, Rachel Hallote, is a professor of history at SUNY Purchase and head of its Jewish studies program. Ozick is the niece of the Hebraist Abraham Regelson.

Yale University has acquired her literary papers. A forthcoming special issue of Studies in Jewish American Literature will examine her contributions to the art of non-fiction.

Literary themes
Ozick's fiction and essays are often about Jewish American life, but she also writes about politics, history, and literary criticism. In addition, she has written and translated poetry.

Henry James occupies a central place in her fiction and nonfiction. The critic Adam Kirsch wrote that her "career-long agon with Henry James... reaches a kind of culmination in Foreign Bodies, her polemical rewriting of The Ambassadors."

The Holocaust and its aftermath is also a dominant theme. For instance in "Who Owns Anne Frank?" she writes that the diary's true meaning has been distorted and eviscerated "by blurb and stage, by shrewdness and naiveté, by cowardice and spirituality, by forgiveness and indifference." Much of her work explores the disparaged self, the reconstruction of identity after immigration, trauma and movement from one class to another.

Ozick says that writing is not a choice but "a kind of hallucinatory madness. You will do it no matter what. You can't not do it." She sees the "freedom in the delectable sense of making things up" as coexisting with the "torment" of writing.

Awards and critical acclaim
In 1971, Ozick received the Edward Lewis Wallant Award and the National Jewish Book Award for her short story collection, The Pagan Rabbi and Other Stories. For Bloodshed and Three Novellas, she received, in 1977, The National Jewish Book Award for Fiction.  In 1997, she received the Diamonstein-Spielvogel Award for the Art of the Essay for Fame and Folly. Four of her stories won first prize in the O. Henry competition.

In 1986, she was selected as the first winner of the Rea Award for the Short Story. In 2000, she won the National Book Critics Circle Award for Quarrel & Quandary. Her novel Heir to the Glimmering World (2004) (published as The Bear Boy in the United Kingdom) won high literary praise. Ozick was on the shortlist for the 2005 Man Booker International Prize, and in 2008 she was awarded the PEN/Nabokov Award and the PEN/Malamud Award, which was established by Bernard Malamud's family to honor excellence in the art of the short story. Her novel Foreign Bodies was shortlisted for the Orange Prize (2012) and the Jewish Quarterly-Wingate Prize (2013).

The novelist David Foster Wallace called Ozick one of the greatest living American writers. She has been described as "the Athena of America's literary pantheon", the "Emily Dickinson of the Bronx", and "one of the most accomplished and graceful literary stylists of her time".

Bibliography

Novels
 Trust (1966)
 The Cannibal Galaxy (1983)
 The Messiah of Stockholm (1987)
 The Puttermesser Papers (1997)
 Heir to the Glimmering World (2004) (published in the United Kingdom in 2005 as The Bear Boy)
 Foreign Bodies (2010)
 Antiquities (2021)

Short fiction
Collections
 The Pagan Rabbi and Other Stories (1971)
 Bloodshed and Three Novellas (1976)
 Levitation: Five Fictions (1982)
 Envy; or, Yiddish in America (1969)
 The Shawl (1989)
 Collected Stories (2007)
 Dictation: A Quartet (2008)
Stories

Drama
 Blue Light (1994)

Non-fiction 
Essay collections
 All the World Wants the Jews Dead (1974)
 Art and Ardor (1983)
 Metaphor & Memory (1989)
 What Henry James Knew and Other Essays on Writers (1993)
 Fame & Folly: Essays (1996)
 "SHE: Portrait of the Essay as a warm body" (1998)
 Quarrel & Quandary (2000)
 The Din in the Head: Essays (2006)
 Critics, Monsters, Fanatics, and Other Literary Essays (2016)
 David Miller, ed. Letters of Intent: Selected Essays (2017)
Miscellaneous
 A Cynthia Ozick Reader (1996)
 The Complete Works of Isaac Babel (introduction 2001)
  Fistfuls of Masterpieces

Critical studies and reviews of Ozick's work
 2000 The New York Times: "The Girl Who Would Be James" by John Sutherland  (on Ozick's book Quarrel & Quandary)
 2002 Partisan Review: "Cynthia Ozick, Aesthete" by Sanford Pinsker
 2005 The Guardian: "The World is Not Enough" by Ali Smith (on Ozick's book The Bear Boy)
 2006 The New York Times Book Review: "The Canon as Cannon", by Walter Kirn (on Ozick's book The Din in the Head)
 2010 The New York Times Book Review: "Cynthia Ozick’s Homage to Henry James", by Thomas Mallon (on Ozick's book Foreign Bodies)
 2010 The New York Times Book Review: "A Jamesian Pays Tribute in a Retelling", by Charles McGrath (on Ozick's book Foreign Bodies)
———————
Notes

See also
Jewish American literature

References

Further reading
 
"The Lesson of the Master," Ozick's essay on the story by Henry James at Narrative Magazine.

External links 

"The Uncut Interview with Cynthia Ozick" at City Arts
Cynthia Ozick Interview at The Morning News
1997 interview about The Puttermesser Papers
 

Hunter College High School alumni
Writers from New Rochelle, New York
1928 births
Living people
20th-century American novelists
20th-century American short story writers
20th-century American women writers
21st-century American Jews
21st-century American novelists
21st-century American short story writers
21st-century American women writers
American people of Belarusian-Jewish descent
American women novelists
American women short story writers
Jewish American novelists
Jewish American short story writers
Jewish women writers
Members of the American Academy of Arts and Letters
National Humanities Medal recipients
New York University alumni
The New Yorker people
Novelists from New York (state)
O. Henry Award winners
Ohio State University Graduate School alumni
PEN/Diamonstein-Spielvogel Award winners
PEN/Faulkner Award for Fiction winners
PEN/Malamud Award winners
PEN/Nabokov Award winners
Postmodern writers
Writers from New York City